Tōki Susumu (born July 4, 1974 as Jun Tamaki) is a former sumo wrestler from Ichikawa, Chiba Prefecture, Japan. His highest rank was komusubi. He is now a sumo coach.

Career
Tōki began his career in January 1991 after joining the Takasago stable. Just like former sekiwake Takamiyama, who was a member of the same stable during the 1970s and 80s, Tōki wore long sideburns as a distinctive feature.

In 1998 Tōki managed to enter the top makuuchi division for the first time and quickly became a regular maegashira, although his results were not sufficient to make him a san'yaku wrestler (although he was a komusubi for one tournament in September 2003, he could not retain this rank). He was not a great challenge to the top wrestlers in his makuuchi days, losing every bout he fought against both Musashimaru and Takanohana. He never managed to defeat a yokozuna or win a special prize.

On December 18, 2000 in Osaka Tōki was behind the wheel of a car which hit a pedestrian and killed her. He should not have been driving at all because the Sumo Association had banned all wrestlers from doing so following a previous incident. Tōki was told by the Sumo Association not to leave his house for two months, and given a 20 percent pay cut. He withdrew from the January 2001 tournament as a result, and fell to the jūryō division. This left the Takasago stable without any top division wrestlers for the first time in its 123-year history. However, Tōki was immediately promoted back to makuuchi following his return to the ring in March 2001.

In 2004, Tōki suffered a shoulder injury which eventually led to him dropping to jūryō once more. He did not succeed in making a sustained comeback to makuuchi, although he managed to return temporarily twice. He suffered increasingly from back problems related to spinal stenosis, which was the reason why he missed six days of the January 2006 tournament. This also reduced the power of his pushes and thrusts to his opponents. After a disastrous make-koshi in March, Tōki was demoted to makushita in May 2006 and announced his retirement on the day the tournament started.

Fighting style

Tōki relied almost exclusively on slapping and pushing techniques, making his style very predictable, yet often surprisingly successful. However, he was very vulnerable when his opponents got hold of his mawashi. He won only eight matches in his career by yori-kiri, or force out, and lost 132. His most common winning kimarite were the slap down, hataki-komi, and the pull down, hiki-otoshi.

Retirement from sumo

Tōki had his official retirement ceremony on January 27, 2007 and worked as a coach at Kokonoe stable. Until January 2010 he used the name Sanoyama Oyakata. However, the elder stock is owned by the stable's former ōzeki Chiyotaikai, and upon Chiyotaikai's retirement Tōki switched to the Asakayama name owned by Kaiō. He changed once again, to Oshiogawa Oyakata, in September 2010. In 2012 he became Sendagawa Oyakata and in the same year left Kokonoe stable to take up a coaching role at Nishikido stable.

Career record

See also
List of sumo tournament second division champions
Glossary of sumo terms
List of past sumo wrestlers
List of sumo elders
List of komusubi

References

External links 

Toki's basho results in Makuuchi and Juryo
Article on Toki

Japanese sumo wrestlers
Living people
1974 births
People from Ichikawa, Chiba
Sumo people from Chiba Prefecture
Komusubi
Kokonoe stable sumo wrestlers